The Assassination of Julius Caesar is a 1888 painting by William Holmes Sullivan which depicts the assassination of Julius Caesar at the hands of his fellow senators. The painting, like Sullivan's other works, is based on Shakespare's play the Tragedy of Julius Caesar, depicts the Act III, Scene 1, and is placed in the Royal Shakespeare Theatre. A similar version by Sullivan is named Et tu Brute.

See also
 Cultural depictions of Julius Caesar

References

Further reading

External links

 William Shakespeare’s JULIUS CAESAR

Paintings of the death of Julius Caesar
Works based on Julius Caesar (play)
1888 paintings
English paintings